Venomous Concept is an American hardcore punk band formed by Kevin Sharp of Brutal Truth and Shane Embury of Napalm Death in 2004. Sharp and Embury were joined by Danny Herrera and Buzz Osborne, who was later replaced by Danny Lilker. They have released three albums: Retroactive Abortion (2004), Poisoned Apple (2008), and Kick Me Silly VCIII (2016). They have also released two split albums: one with Japanese grindcore band 324 (2006), and the other with Australian extreme metal band Blood Duster (2008). The band's name is a play on Poison Idea, in the style of name-mangling Japanese hardcore acts.

History
In February 2004, Kevin Sharp was the tour driver for Napalm Death on The Art of Noise tour with Nile, Strapping Young Lad, Dark Tranquillity and The Berzerker. Shane Embury and Sharp were already acquainted, and "some beers, pizza and old vinyl classics by Poison Idea, Black Flag and Systematic Death" renewed their friendship. They decided to start a band together. Embury remembered: 
They recruited Buzz Osborne of the Melvins on guitar and Napalm Death's Danny Herrera on drums, and released their debut Retroactive Abortion (2004) via Mike Patton's Ipecac Recordings. The band replaced Osborne with Danny Lilker for their second album, Poisoned Apple (2008). In 2006, Belgian record label Hypertension Records re-issued Retroactive Abortion on vinyl.

Members

Current
 Shane Embury (Napalm Death) – guitar
 Danny Herrera (Napalm Death) – drums
 Danny Lilker (Brutal Truth, Nuclear Assault) – bass
 Kevin Sharp (Brutal Truth, Primate) – vocals
 John Cooke (touring musician for Napalm Death) – guitar

Former
 Buzz Osborne (Melvins, Fantômas) – guitar

Discography
Studio albums
 Retroactive Abortion (2004)
 Poisoned Apple (2008)
 Kick Me Silly VCIII (2016)
 Politics Versus the Erection (2020)
 The Good Ship Lollipop (2023)

Splits
 Split CD/7" with 324 (2006)
 Split 7" with Blood Duster (2008)

References

American grindcore musical groups
Hardcore punk groups from Illinois
Political music groups
Ipecac Recordings artists
Century Media Records artists
Season of Mist artists
Hypertension Records artists